Zaur Akhmedovich Osmayev (born 6 September 1986) is a former Russian professional football player.

Club career
He made his Russian Football National League debut for FC Angusht Nazran on 16 March 2014 in a game against FC Torpedo Moscow.

External links
 
 
 Career summary by sportbox.ru

1986 births
Sportspeople from Grozny
Living people
Russian footballers
Association football midfielders
FC Akhmat Grozny players
FC Angusht Nazran players